Shane Harte (also known as Scamp Scally Wag) is a Canadian actor and singer. He is known for his role as Luke, in the Family series Lost & Found Music Studios. He also appeared as Luke in The Next Step.

In 2013, Harte was a member of hip hop artist Classified's "Inner Ninja" children's choir, appearing on the MuchMusic Video Awards and on MuchMusic's New Music Live. In 2015, he released two singles called "Let You Know" and "Left Standing". He is also a part of the soundtrack from Lost & Found Music Studios.

Filmography

References

External links
 

Canadian male child actors
Canadian male television actors
Living people
1996 births